Helsingør Gymnasium (In English: Elsinore High School) is a high school in Elsinore, Denmark. It opened in 1978 in an existing set of buildings from the 60s. Earlier Espergaerde High School had the name "Elsinore High School".

Alumni
 Jakob Boeskov, artist
 Martin Lidegaard, politician
 Marianne Nøhr Larsen, anthropologist
 Pia Tafdrup, poet

External links
 Helsingør Gymnasium - School Homepage

Buildings and structures in Helsingør Municipality
Educational institutions established in 1978
Schools in Denmark
Helsingør
1978 establishments in Denmark